The Albanian local elections in 1996 was the second local election held in Albania. The elections were held on 20 and 27 October 1996 and the winner was the Democratic Party of Albania.

Results

References

1996 elections in Albania
Local elections
1996
October 1996 events in Europe